The 1931 Sunderland by-election was held on 26 March 1931.  The by-election was held due to the death of the incumbent Labour MP, Alfred Smith. Smith and his Labour colleague Dr Marion Phillips had gained the two-member seat at the last general election from the Conservatives Luke Thompson and Walter Raine, who had first won it in 1922 Another defeated candidate in 1929 was the Liberal Dr Betty Morgan, then aged 24. Both Thompson and Morgan contested the by-election.

The by-election saw Luke Thompson narrowly regain the seat he had lost in 1929 for the Conservatives. At the general election held later in the year, Thompson was returned with a greatly increased majority of over 23,000 votes, and his fellow Conservative Samuel Storey was also comfortably elected as the seat's second member.

References

Sunderland by-election
Sunderland by-election
Politics of the City of Sunderland
By-elections to the Parliament of the United Kingdom in County Durham constituencies
Sunderland by-election
20th century in County Durham